Esfandiar "Esse" Baharmast (born March 11, 1954) is a retired Iranian-American football referee best known for supervising two matches during the 1998 FIFA World Cup held in France.

Career
At that tournament, he was briefly vilified for giving a late penalty to Norway in the dying minutes of their first-round game with Brazil, only to be vindicated the following day when a Swedish TV station released previously unseen TV footage from a new camera angle indisputably showing that he made the right call; Norway striker Tore André Flo did indeed have his jersey pulled by Brazil defender Júnior Baiano. The call was later selected by Referee Magazine as one of the "Best 18 Calls of All Time."

He continued his involvement in refereeing by becoming the Director of Officials for US Soccer in August 1998. He also officiated the first MLS match on April 6, 1996, between San Jose Clash & D.C. United. He has been a member of CONCACAF Referees' Committee since 2003 and a FIFA Instructor.

As a FIFA instructor, he has been involved in numerous tournaments, such as FIFA U-17 World Cup in Finland (2003), FIFA U-20 World Cups in Netherlands (2005) and Canada (2007), FIFA World Cup in Germany (2006) and Beijing Olympic Games in China (2008).

He is currently working for FIFA as a technical instructor in the Referee Assistance Program (FIFA RAP) and dealt with the instruction and preparation of the referees for the 2010 World Cup in South Africa. He is also the current Colorado director of referees.

See also 
MLS Referee of the Year Award

References

External links 
 Profile
 Analysis of Norway/Brazil incident

1954 births
American soccer referees
FIFA World Cup referees
1998 FIFA World Cup referees
American people of Iranian descent
Sportspeople of Iranian descent
Iranian football referees
Living people
Copa América referees
Place of birth missing (living people)
CONCACAF Gold Cup referees
Olympic football referees
Major League Soccer referees
National Soccer Hall of Fame members